Pedioplanis laticeps, known commonly as the Cape sand lizard or the Karoo sand lizard, is a species of lizard in the family Lacertidae. The species is endemic to Southern Africa.

Geographic range
P. laticeps is found in southern Namibia and western South Africa.

Habitat
The preferred natural habitat of P. laticeps is shrubland.

Description
The coloration of P. laticeps is very variable. There is no gular fold, and the nasals are not in contact with each other behind the rostral.<ref>Branch, Bill (2004). Field Guide to Snakes and other Reptiles of Southern Africa. Third Revised edition, Second impression. Sanibel Island, Florida: Ralph Curtis Books. 399 pp. . (Pedioplanis laticeps, p. 171 + Plate 59).</ref>

ReproductionP. laticeps is oviparous.

References

Further reading
Kirchhof S, Penner J, Müller J (2017). "Resolution of the types, diagnostic features, and distribution of two easily confused Sand Lizards, Pedioplanis laticeps (Smith, 1845) and P. burchelli (Duméril & Bibron, 1839) (Squamata: Lacertidae)". Zootaxa 4318 (1): 82–109.
Plessis IJ, Mouton PFN (2011). "Habitat Preferences of Three Sympatric Lacertid Lizards in the Arid Tankwa Karoo Basin of South Africa". African Zoology 46 (1): 88–94.
Smith A (1845). Illustrations of the Zoology of South Africa; Consisting Chiefly of Figures and Descriptions of the Objects of Natural History Collected during an Expedition into the Interior of South Africa, in the Years 1834, 1835, and 1836; Fitted out by "The Cape of Good Hope Association for Exploring Central Africa:" Together with a Summary of African Zoology, and an Inquiry into the Geographical Ranges of Species in that Quarter of the Globe. [Volume III. Reptilia]. London: Lords Commissioners of her Majesty's Treasury. (Smith, Elder and Co., printers). Plates I–XLVIII + unnumbered pages of text. (Eremias laticeps'', new species, plate XLVI, figure 1 + two unnumbered pages). (in English and Latin).

Pedioplanis
Lacertid lizards of Africa
Reptiles of Namibia
Reptiles of South Africa
Reptiles described in 1845
Taxa named by Andrew Smith (zoologist)